The Allen Organ Company builds church organs, home organs, and theatre organs. Its factory is located in Macungie, Pennsylvania. The Allen International Sales Headquarters also includes the Jerome Markowitz Memorial Center, a museum. It displays many instruments that represent technological milestones in the development of the pipeless, electronicorgan.

Customers of the Allen Organ Company can choose from an array of sounds. Because of hard chips and computer programming, organs can be programmed to the customer’s taste. If sounds aren’t to a customer’s satisfaction, the organ can be re-tuned or reprogrammed at home by a company representative. Many churches are switching over to computer processed organs, made or inspired by the Allen Organ Company’s models, as opposed to the traditional pipe organs.

History
Allen Organ Company was founded in 1937 and named after its birthplace, Allentown, Pennsylvania. The company was incorporated in 1945, after interruption by World War II. Since its beginning, Allen has been managed by the same family. Steve Markowitz, the current President, is the son of the founder, Jerome Markowitz.

The company had its first patent in 1938. Allen continued to advance analog tone generation through the 1960s with further patents. In 1971, as the culmination of a collaborative effort with North American Rockwell, Allen introduced the world's first commercially-available digital musical instrument. Allen was responsible for the first three-manual electronic organ and the first electronic drawknob console. The first Allen Digital Organ is now in the Smithsonian Institution.

Allen Organ Company added a manufacturing  branch in England in 1969.

1947: Allen installed the world's first three-manual electronic organ in St. Paul's Lutheran Church in Catasauqua, Pennsylvania.
1949: full-range, high-fidelity stereo audio equipment was incorporated in Allen installations.
1950: "Purely Electronic Carillon," "Harp Percussion" and sustain effects were introduced.
1952: "Chromatic Voicing" was introduced.
1953: Manufacturing was relocated to Macungie, Pennsylvania, to expand capacity.
1954: Allen built the first four-manual electronic organ.
1955: Allen developed the first electronic 32' stops used with pipe organs. 
1958: the TC-1 was the world's first transistor church organ.
1959: Solid State Tone Generation (transistors) replaced vacuum tube oscillators in the entire Allen line.
1960: Allen introduced its patented "Random Motion Electronic", or "Whind".
1963: First European representation established in Zurich, Switzerland.
1969: Allen entered into a joint venture with North American Rockwell for digital sound research and development. The Digital Computer Organ employed LSI (Large Scale Integration) circuits.
1971: Using the technical knowledge co-developed with Rockwell International, in 1971 Allen produced the world's first digital organs. That same year, Sharp introduced its hand-held calculator. Together, these were the world's first two digital consumer products.
2004: Allen's first digital musical instrument became part of Smithsonian Institution's collection of musical instruments.
2010: Allen Organ Company Honored by United States Congress

Technology

Quantum line
The Quantum organ line uses a digital processing technique called the convolution reverb, a technique widely used in both software and hardware musical instruments.  In Allen's implementation of the technique, the acoustics of the sampled room become an integral part of the organ's sound.  An 8-second stereo convolution reverb requires about 35 billion calculations per second; Allen patented a technique to reduce the computation amount to about 400 million calculations per second. A digital organ that produces Compact Disc quality sound without convolution reverb would require only about  calculations per second for each sound. Quantum organs include about  times that capacity to create convolution reverb.

Electric organs 
The Allen organ is a type of electronic organ that was created in 1937 and 1939. It was the first organ to become available for sale to the public. The Allen organ company was also responsible for creating the first transistorized organ in 1951. In addition to that, a new way of generating sound, by digital waves, for the organ was produced in 1971. This new technology, new at the time, is seen in many organs that are available now. An example of the 1971 instrument can be seen and heard at the Musical Museum in Brentford in West London, England.

Allen Organs created a handful of electric pianos in the 1980s. Some are:

 Electra-Piano
 Rock-si-cord
 RMI Keyboard Computer KC-I  and KC-II (These are two of the first polyphonic synthesizers.)

GENISYS 
A computer software called GENISYS controls the sound and power panels on the organs. GENISYS is seen as the company’s best for sound quality and tone control. There is a variety of orchestral and organ tones that can be tuned for an individual’s organ. The sound can be modified using a computer program that goes along with the GENISYS interface.

Museum 
The Allen Organ Company factory building is located at 150 Locust Street in Macungie, Pennsylvania. It was originally an air conditioned textile mill that Allen's founder, Jerome Markowitz and Vice President purchased (wisely, along with thousands of acres of vacant land that have been fabulously developed), they renovated the mill and moved organ manufacturing into around 1953. As the company grew, The International Sales Headquarters was built including Octave Hall (a room with adjustable natural reverb and rotating stage), teaching studios, a recording studio and the adjoining Jerome Markowitz Memorial Museum is located on Route 100. In the Museum, you can look at the development of Allen technology from tube analog organs from 1938 to the present, how an organ is made and the history and take tour of the museum.

See also
Carlo Curley, an Allen organist
Virgil Fox, played an Allen organ on his Heavy Organ tours
Walt Strony, an organist who designed a digital organ for Allen, the Allen STR-4

References

External links

NAMM Oral History Interview: Martha Markowitz reflects on the early days of the Allen Organ Company September 11, 2005
NAMM Oral History Interview: Steve Markowitz talks about his father's development of the first Allen electronic organs September 11, 2005

Electronic organ manufacturing companies
Manufacturing companies established in 1937
Companies based in Lehigh County, Pennsylvania
1937 establishments in Pennsylvania
Pipe organ
Musical instrument manufacturing companies of the United States